Michael McCafferty may refer to:

 Michael McCafferty (software entrepreneur) (born 1942), entrepreneur
 Michael McCafferty, American actor in The Invisible Man (2000 TV series) Not a Father's Day
Michael McCafferty, British poet in Children of Albion: Poetry of the Underground in Britain
Michael McCafferty, American researcher of Illinois Indians and Des Moines River
Michael McCafferty, Northern Ireland musician of Swanee River (band)

See also
Distinguish from
 Michael Cafferty, British ambassador to Dominican Republic, see List of Ambassadors of the United Kingdom to the Dominican Republic

McCafferty, Michael